Depresszió (English: Depression) is a Hungarian Metal and Rock band, formed in late 1999 by Ferenc Halász (vocals and guitar), Dávid Nagy (drums), and Roland Reichert (bass), with Ádám Hartmann joining in shortly afterwards to create the band. In 2000, they first got their own concert. In August 2000, their first full-length album was recorded. They have 7 studio albums, 1 EP, and 3 DVDs so far. In late 2013, they announced to participate in A Dal 2014 with the song Csak a zene, which managed to get to the final, but not qualify for the super-final.

Band members
Ferenc Halász—Vocals, guitar
Ádám Hartmann—Guitar, backing vocals
Dávid Nagy—Drums
Zoltán Kovács—Bass, growls

Past members
Miklós "Soda" Pálffy—Sampler, keyboards, vocals
Roland Reichert—Bass

Discography

Studio albums

Tiszta erőből (2000)
Amíg tart (2002)
Egy életen át (2004)
Az ébredés útján (2006)
Egyensúly (2008)
Vízválasztó (2011)
A folyamat zajlik (2014)
Válaszok után... (2017)
Nehéz szó (2019)

Concert Albums
Csak a zene (2013)

Selection albums
Nincs jobb kor (2010)

Singles
Még1X (2006)

Demo album
Messiás (demó) (1999)

Videos
Depi birthdayVD (2005)
DE 3,14 Live (2008)
10 éves jubileumi koncert (2011)
15 éves jubileumi koncert (2016)

References

Hungarian heavy metal musical groups